Harry Gleaves Few  (8 September 1848 — 9 April 1931) was an English first-class cricketer.

The son of Edward Few, he was born at the Cambridgeshire village of Willingham in September 1848. He played first-class cricket for  Cambridgeshire, making his debut aged 17 against Cambridge University at Fenner's in 1866. He had success in this match, taking a five wicket haul in the Cambirdge University first innings with figures of 5 for 72 with his left-arm roundarm medium bowling. He made a second first-class match in the same season against Nottinghamshire, but did not appear for Cambridgeshire after. Across these two matches, he took 8 wickets at an average of 21.25. It was noted by Fred Lillywhite that Few generally fielded at slip or point. Outside of cricket, he was a merchant at Willingham and was a member of the Cambridge Antiquarian Society. He was a justice of the peace for Cambridgeshire by 1912. Few died following a period of long ill health in April 1931.

References

External links

1848 births
1931 deaths
People from South Cambridgeshire District
English cricketers
Cambridge Town Club cricketers
English merchants
English justices of the peace